Christopher Zanella (born 21 October 1989) is a Swiss former racing driver.

Career

Formula Renault 2.0 Switzerland
Zanella, born in Waldshut-Tiengen, began competing in formula racing with Formula Renault 2.0 Switzerland in 2007. In 2008 he won the championship. He later competed in Formula Three Euroseries and the Eurocup Formula Renault 2.0.

Formula Two
In 2011, Zanella moved to the FIA Formula Two Championship. His season began well, and he led the championship after four races, having won both races in the Magny Cours round. He remained in Formula Two for 2012, winning twice during the year in Nürburgring and Autodromo Nazionale Monza who was also the last ever race for Formula Two.

Formula Renault 3.5 Series

After the FIA Formula Two Championship was disbanded in the end of 2012, He tested with various Formula Renault 3.5 teams during the 2012-13 off-season, He signed with Czech team ISR Racing partnering Russian driver Sergey Sirotkin, in his series debut in Monza he finished 3rd in the race, various months ago he won the last Formula Two race ever also in Monza coinciding with his podium in his debut, in Race 2 he finished 8th giving him 19 points during the weekend.

Racing record

Complete Formula 3 Euro Series results
(key) (Races in bold indicate pole position; races in italics indicate fastest lap)

† Driver did not finish the race, but was classified as he completed over 90% of the race distance.

Complete FIA Formula Two Championship results
(key) (Races in bold indicate pole position) (Races in italics indicate fastest lap)

Complete Formula Renault 3.5 Series results
(key) (Races in bold indicate pole position) (Races in italics indicate fastest lap)

References

External links
 
 

1989 births
Living people
Swiss racing drivers
Formula Renault Eurocup drivers
Formula Renault 2.0 Alps drivers
Formula 3 Euro Series drivers
Formula Ford drivers
Italian Formula Three Championship drivers
FIA Formula Two Championship drivers
World Series Formula V8 3.5 drivers
ADAC GT Masters drivers
Motopark Academy drivers
ISR Racing drivers
Jenzer Motorsport drivers